O Sexo dos Anjos is a Brazilian telenovela (soap opera) produced and aired in the 6pm time slot by TV Globo from September 25, 1989, to March 9, 1990, in 143 chapters. It replaced Pacto de Sangue in the same time slot and was succeeded by Gente Fina.

Written by Ivani Ribeiro, with collaboration with Solange Castro Neves, it was inspired by O Terceiro Pecado, and it was directed by Roberto Talma along with collaborators Flávio Colatrello Jr. and Fábio Sabag.

Synopsis 
The Angel of Death (Bia Seidl) sends to Earth an emissary, Adriano (Felipe Camargo), to look for a young woman Isabela (Isabela Garcia). But he ends up falling in love with the girl and, tries to bargain her soul for that of her mean sister's, Ruth (Sílvia Buarque). Death does not accept the exchange, but agrees to give the young woman another chance. She commits only two sins; if he commits the third, she will die. Meanwhile, Ruth usually mistreats her brother, the deaf Tomás (Marcos Frota) - whom she blames as being the cause of all her troubles - and lives fighting with Diogo (Caíque Ferreira), a friend of the family, until she finds out she's in love with him.

One story also focused on the romance of Gigi (Carla Marins) and Zé Paulo (Irving São Paulo), watched closely by the boy's mother, Vera (Norma Benguell), who does not accept the poor girl as his son's girlfriend. Vera herself hides a passion for Durval (Paulo Figueiredo), the boyfriend of her sister Leonor (Myrian Pérsia), mother of Isabela, Ruth and Tomás.

In life, families seem like a mysterious figure of Father Aurélio (Mário Gomes), a man who hides his past and his true identity. He is Renato, an environmentalist who suffers the persecution of powerful landowners for defending a nature. But the Angel of Death descends to Earth to watch the work of his emissary, Adriano. Under the identity of the mysterious Diana, she ends up being interested in Renato.

Cast

External links

1989 Brazilian television series debuts
1990 Brazilian television series endings
1989 telenovelas
TV Globo telenovelas
Brazilian telenovelas
Portuguese-language telenovelas
Angels in television
Television series about personifications of death